Alpheus fasqueli is a crustacean belonging to the family of snapping shrimp. It was first isolated in Sri Lanka. It counts with a setose carapace, an acute and carinate rostrum, and unarmed orbital hoods. Its basicerite has a strong ventrolateral tooth. The lamella of its scaphocerite is not reduced. Its third maxilliped counts with an epipodial plate bearing thick setae, while its first chelipeds are found with their merus bearing a strong disto-mesial tooth; its third pereiopod has an armed ischium, with a simple and conical dactylus. Its telson is broad, distally tapering, with 2 pairs of dorsal spines. The species is named after Frédéric Fasquel, a photographer who contributed rare shrimp specimens for the Muséum national d'histoire naturelle.

Description
Its carapace is smooth, possessing shallow grooves latero-anteriorly, and scattered setae dorsally. Its pterygostomial angle is rounded, while its rostrum is well developed and descendant; its orbital hoods are inflated, lacking teeth. Its corneas are well developed, while its eyes have small anterior processes, and its antennular peduncles are stout.

Its antenna shows a basicerite bearing an acute, ventrolateral tooth. Its mouthparts are the same as for Alpheus tricolor: its incisor process bearing less than 10 teeth. The epipodial plate on the coxa of its third maxilliped bears thick, blunt setae.

Its merus is slightly crenellated on the mesial margin, and contains no teeth. Its carpus is very short. Its uropodal exopod has a moderately developed lateral spine, and a sinuous diaresis. The species' telson is broad, distally tapering, exhibiting 2 pairs of dorsal spines.

Coloration
Its carapace is coloured bright red, with circular and elongated whitish patches. Its rostrum is red and its orbital hoods transparent. The antennal and antennular peduncles are reddish, while both flagella are purplish red. Its major and minor chelipeds are red; the merus showing a distal white patch; chelae are deep red, white on the tips of fingers. The species' abdomen is red, and the pleura exhibiting a bordeaux red colour ventrally. Its uropods are red, as is its telson.

See also
Decapod anatomy

References

Further reading
Williams, S. T., N. Knowlton, and L. A. Weigt. "Indo-Pacific molecular biogeography of the coral-dwelling snapping shrimp Alpheus lottini (Decapoda: Caridea: Alpheidae)." (1999).
Malay, M. C. D., Tomoyuki Komai, and Tin-Yam Chan. "A new cryptic species in the “Calcinus anani Poupin & McLaughlin, 1998” species complex (Decapoda: Anomura: Diogenidae): evidence from colouration and molecular genetics." Zootaxa 3367 (2012): 165-175.
Christoffersen, M. L., and G. E. Ramos. "A NEW SPECIES OF Alpheus (CRUSTACEAE, CARIDEA) FROM THE PACIFIC COAST OF COLOMBIA."Revista Nordestina de Biologia 6.1 (2014): 61-65.
Anker, Arthur. "Notes on two rare and little-known Indo-Pacific snapping shrimps, Alpheus percyi Coutière, 1908 and A. pseudopugnax (Banner, 1953)(Decapoda, Alpheidae)." Zootaxa 3722.2 (2013): 267-282.

External links
WORMS

Alpheidae
Crustaceans described in 2001